José Ramón Cabañas Rodríguez is a Cuban diplomat. He became the first Ambassador of Cuba to the United States in 50 years in September 2015.

References 

Living people
Year of birth missing (living people)
Place of birth missing (living people)

Ambassadors of Cuba to the United States
Cuban diplomats